Gheshlagh Bridge is located east of Sanandaj, the center of Iran’s Kurdistan province.

This bridge on Gheshlagh river is a remnant of Safavids and Zandieh era. It was renovated later, especially by Qajar's dynasty. The bridge was constructed by the order of Shah Safi of Persia, on the route from Sanandaj to Hamedan. Two centuries later, when the bridge was almost ruined, it was renovated again. A stone inscription on the facing mountain reads the name of Gholam Hossein Khan who repaired the bridge.

The bridge's architecture 
The bridge is built on a straight line, its length is about 78 meters, width of 3 meters and has six openings. This bridge is an example of high technique of bridge building in Safavids era. The six openings have zigzag shape ceilings. Width of openings increase from east to west, it starts from 2.20 m and reaches to 4.20m. The height of bridge from the river bed, at its highest point, reaches to about 4.6m. The height of ceiling columns from the river bed varies from 1.5m to 2.5m. On the top of the bridge there is a half a meter turret on each side of the passageway. The triangular bases are to divide the stream of water. Gulches on the height of 1.2m and width of 0.8m are made on the base. The passage over the bridge is paved. The bridge's rock bases have come out 1 m above the pavement. The main body of the bridge is constructed of bricks.

References 

Architecture in Iran
Islamic architecture
Persian art
Lists of tourist attractions in Iran
Bridges in Iran
Safavid architecture